Om Prakash is an Indian film actor.

Om Prakash may also refer to:

 Om Prakash (cinematographer) (born 1978), Indian cinematographer working in Tamil cinema
 Om Prakash (general) (born 1955), Indian army officer
 Om Prakash (historian) (born 1940), Indian economic historian
 Om Prakash (rower), Indian rower
 Om Prakash Karhana (born 1987), Indian shot putter
 Om Prakash Gurjar (born 1992), former child labourer who won the International Children's Peace Prize
 Om (actor) (Om Prakash Sahani), Indian actor
 Sandir Om Prakash (1929–1994), Indian cricketer

See also